The Devil Wears Prada may refer to:

 The Devil Wears Prada (novel), the 2003 novel by Lauren Weisberger
 The Devil Wears Prada (film), the 2006 film based on the novel
 The Devil Wears Prada (soundtrack), the soundtrack album from the film
 The Devil Wears Prada (musical), the musical based on the novel and film
 The Devil Wears Prada (band), the American metalcore band